Vesicle transport through interaction with t-SNAREs homolog 1B is a protein that in humans is encoded by the VTI1B gene.

Interactions 

VTI1B has been shown to interact with STX8.

References

Further reading